Ahmad Abdullah Kamshad Al Beloushi (born 11 April 1981) is a Kuwaiti footballer who is a forward for the Kuwaiti Premier League club Al Yarmouk.

References

External links

1981 births
Living people
Kuwaiti footballers
Sportspeople from Kuwait City
Association football forwards
Kuwait international footballers
Qadsia SC players
Al-Yarmouk SC (Kuwait) players
Kuwait Premier League players